Kirby Cane is a scattered village and civil parish centred  west northwest of Beccles and  northeast of Bungay. It is in south-east Norfolk. It housed 375 people in 152 households as at 2001 – then 434 in 179 households at the 2011 Census, the increase in households being almost 18% – unusually large for England. Its north-eastern neighbourhood is often known as Kirby Green. The land drains gently south to the Waveney which is the border with Suffolk.

Further north of its isolated church and its small smattering of houses is Wash Lane which leads to the A146 road (between Norwich and Beccles).

Church of All Saints

This church has one of 124 existing round towers in Norfolk and it is crenellated (has an embattled parapet wall on its roof, and furthermore lancet and slit windows) and built of rustic, light, local stone with a hipped roof of slate or other tiles. It is a Grade I listed building, which is the highest and by far the rarest category of statutory protection and recognition.

See also
 Clavering hundred

Notes

External links

Bounds of the ecclesiastical (C of E) parish today - A Church Near You (The Church of England)
Bounds of the civil parish recently; in the 1880s; and other statistics - Vision of Britain (The University of Portsmouth and others)
Notes on village genuki collaborative genealogy and local research information for UK and Ireland (now part of origins.org.uk)
All Saints on the European Round Tower Churches website roundtowerchurches.net
Pictures and articles on Kirby Cane and Ellingham kirbycaneandellinghamhistoricalresearchgroup.btck.co.uk

Churches in Norfolk
Villages in Norfolk
Civil parishes in Norfolk